Havin' a Bad Day is the first album by Dweezil Zappa, released in 1986.

Track listing
All songs written by Dweezil Zappa, except where noted.
"Havin' a Bad Day" (Zappa, Scott Thunes) 4:09
"Blonde Hair, Brown Nose" (Zappa, Thunes) 3:45
"You Can't Ruin Me" 5:25
"The Pirate Song" 3:51
"You Can't Imagine" 3:14
"Let's Talk About It" 4:05
"Electric Hoedown" 3:24
"I Want a Yacht" (Zappa, Thunes, Gail Zappa) 3:40
"I Feel Like I Wanna Cry" 4:28

References

Dweezil Zappa albums
Barking Pumpkin Records albums
1986 debut albums